The 2016 United States House of Representatives elections in Louisiana were held on November 8, 2016, to elect the six U.S. representatives from the state of Louisiana, one from each of the state's six congressional districts. The elections coincided with the 2016 U.S. presidential election, as well as other elections to the House of Representatives, elections to the United States Senate and various state and local elections.

District 1

The incumbent is Republican Steve Scalise, who has represented the district since 2008. He was re-elected with 78% of the vote in 2014.

In late 2014, Scalise became embroiled in a controversy over a speech he had given to the white supremacist group European-American Unity and Rights Organization, which was founded by David Duke, in 2002. After it emerged that earlier in his career, Scalise has compared himself to Duke, Scalise distanced himself from Duke. This prompted Duke to say that he may run against Scalise in 2016 because Scalise had been "elected on false pretenses" and had "betrayed" the voters by "suggesting that they're racist because they supported my views". In July 2016, Duke said he was considering running against Scalise.

Candidates

Republican

Declared
 Steve Scalise, Incumbent, House Majority Whip

Declined
 David Duke, former state representative, candidate for Governor of Louisiana in 1991, and former Ku Klux Klan Grand Wizard (ran for U.S. Senate)

Democratic
Declared
 Lee Ann Dugas
 Danil Faust
 Joe Swider, psychiatrist

Libertarian
Declared
 Howard Kearney

Green
Declared
 Eliot Barron

Independent
Declared 
 Chuemai Yang

General election

Results

District 2

Democratic incumbent Cedric Richmond has represented the 2nd district since 2011.  He was re-elected in 2014 with 69% of the vote.

Candidates

Democratic

Declared
 Kenneth Cutno
 Kip Holden, mayor-president of East Baton Rouge Parish and candidate for lieutenant governor in 2015
 Cedric Richmond, incumbent U.S. Representative

Libertarian

Declared
 Samuel Davenport, Libertarian Candidate for the 2nd Congressional District in 2014

General election

Results

District 3

Incumbent Republican Charles Boustany, who has represented the 3rd district since 2013, and previously represented the 7th district from 2005 to 2013, is running for the United States Senate.

Candidates

Republican
Declared
 Scott Angelle, Public Service Commissioner, former Lieutenant Governor of Louisiana and candidate for governor in 2015
 Bryan Barrilleaux, physician and candidate in 2012 and 2014
 Greg Ellison, energy executive, retired lieutenant colonel
 Brett Geymann, state representative
 Clay Higgins, deputy marshal of Lafayette, former public information officer and captain of St. Landry Parish Sheriff's Office
 Gus Rantz, businessman
 Grover Rees, III, former United States Ambassador to East Timor
 Herman Vidrine, retired state employee

Withdrawn
 Erick Knezek, Lafayette School Board member

Democratic
Declared
 Jacob "Dorian Phibian" Hebert, artist and musician
 Larry Rader, 2011 Democratic candidate for District 49 of the Louisiana House of Representatives

Libertarian
Declared
 Guy McLendon, Texarkana Regional Director of the Gary Johnson 2016 campaign for president, and previously served on the Libertarian Party National Committee, Texas vice-chair, chair of Harris County, Texas, Louisiana vice-chair, and four terms on the LP National Platform Committees – 2006, 2008, 2010 and 2014

Independent
Declared 
 Kenny P. Scelfo Sr., Candidate for Mayor of Franklin in 2014, Franklin City Councilman, Franklin Mayor Pro tempore

Endorsements

General election

Jungle primary

Runoff

District 4

Incumbent Republican John Fleming, who has represented the 4th district since 2009, is running for the United States Senate.

Candidates

Republican
Declared
 Trey Baucum, Shreveport cardiologist
 Elbert Guillory, former state senator from Opelousas and candidate for lieutenant governor in 2015
 Oliver Jenkins, Shreveport City Councilman
 Rick John, attorney
 Mike Johnson, state representative

Declined
 Jim Morris, state representative
 Barrow Peacock, state senator
 Mike Reese, businessman
 Rocky Rockett, president of the Greater Bossier Economic Development Foundation
 Alan Seabaugh, state representative

Democratic
Declared
 Marshall Jones, attorney and candidate in 1988

Declined
 Cedric Glover, state representative and former Mayor of Shreveport
 Keith Hightower, former mayor of Shreveport
 Patrick Jefferson, state representative
 LaLeshia Walker Alford, former Shreveport City Court Judge and candidate for Caddo Parish District Attorney in 2015
LaBrisha Almond, real estate agent and candidate for congress in 2000

Independent
Declared 
 Mark Halverson
 Kenneth Kreft

Endorsements

General election

Jungle primary

Runoff

District 5

The incumbent is Republican Ralph Abraham, who has represented the district since 2015.  He was elected with 64% of the vote in the 2014 runoff election.

Candidates

Republican
Declared
 Ralph Abraham, incumbent U.S. Representative
 Billy Burkette

General election

Results

District 6

Incumbent Republican Garret Graves, who has represented the district since 2015. He was elected with 62% of the vote in the 2014 runoff election over former four-term governor and convicted felon Edwin Washington Edwards, who represented the now-defunct 7th district from 1965 until his first election as governor in 1972.

Candidates

Republican
Declared
 Bob Bell, retired navy captain and candidate in 2014
 Garret Graves, incumbent

Democratic
Declared
 Richard Lieberman, real estate broker and candidate in 2014

Libertarian
Declared
 Richard Fontanesi

Independent
Declared
 Devin Graham

General election

Results

References

External links
Candidates at Vote Smart 
Candidates at Ballotpedia 
Campaign finance at FEC 
Campaign finance at OpenSecrets

Louisiana
2016
United States House of Representatives